The 1921 Giro di Lombardia was the 17th edition of the Giro di Lombardia cycle race and was held on 10 November 1921, on a course of . The race started and finished in Milan.

67 cyclists departed from Milan and 32 completed the race.

General classification

References

External links
 

1921
Giro di Lombardia
Giro di Lombardia